Antonio Madreluis Romero Urquiola (born 16 January 1997) is a Venezuelan footballer who plays as a forward for Zamora.

International career
Romero was called up to the Venezuela under-20 side for the 2017 South American Youth Football Championship.

Career statistics

Club

Honours

International
Venezuela
South American Youth Football Championship: Third-Place 2017

References

1997 births
Living people
Venezuelan footballers
Venezuela youth international footballers
Venezuela under-20 international footballers
Venezuelan expatriate footballers
Association football forwards
Asociación Civil Deportivo Lara players
SK Sigma Olomouc players
Zamora FC players
Royale Union Saint-Gilloise players
Once Caldas footballers
Venezuelan Primera División players
Challenger Pro League players
Czech First League players
People from Barinas (state)
Venezuelan expatriate sportspeople in the Czech Republic
Venezuelan expatriate sportspeople in Belgium
Expatriate footballers in the Czech Republic
Expatriate footballers in Belgium
Expatriate footballers in Colombia